Glenn Moore may refer to:

 Glenn Moore (comedian) (born 1989), comedian
 Glenn Moore (softball), softball coach
 Glenn Moore (rugby union) (born 1959), New Zealand rugby union player
 Glen Moore (botanist) (1917–2012), botanist
 Glen Moore (born 1941), musician

See also
 Glen More, aka Great Glen, Scotland